Burton Road is a stop on the South Manchester Line of Greater Manchester's light rail Metrolink system. It is located on Burton Road, on the border of the suburbs of Withington and West Didsbury in Manchester, England.

The tram stop was opened on 23 May 2013. It was built in a cutting on a section of abandoned railway which was re-opened for light rail operation. The line was originally opened in 1880 as the Manchester South District Line, which ran trains from Manchester Central railway station. The route was closed in 1967, but was re-opened in the 21st century as part of the Metrolink network.

Service pattern 

History

In 1880 the Midland Railway opened the new Manchester South District Line which ran from Throstle Nest Junction, Old Trafford to Heaton Mersey. The line north of Chorlton Junction (with the Manchester, Sheffield & Lincolnshire Railway's line to Fallowfield) was later operated by the Cheshire Lines Committee from 1891 when the Fallowfield line opened, and rail service ran out of Manchester Central station to the southern suburbs. South of Chorlton-cum-Hardy railway station, the line ran south-east through the area with the first station at Withington railway station on the corner of Lapwing Lane and Palatine Road (Withington station was renamed Withington & Albert Park in 1884 and then Withington & West Didsbury in 1915). Withington & West Didsbury station closed in July 1961, although British Rail trains continued to use this route until 1969, when the entre line was closed as part of the Beeching cuts.

In 1984, Greater Manchester Council and Greater Manchester Passenger Transport Executive announced the Project Light Rail scheme to develop a new light rail/tram system by re-opening use of disused railway lines in the region, including the route from Chorlton to East Didsbury. The first phase of the Manchester Metrolink system opened in 1992, but the Manchester South line was not included. Plans to re-open the line for light rail use were proposed in the early 1980s,but these proposals failed several times due to problems securing funding.

Tram tracks were laid along the former trackbed, and a new tram stop was constructed by the Burton Road bridge in Withington. Burton Road Metrolink stop opened on 23 May 2013. Further south along the line, the original Withington railway station was not re-opened, but was replaced with a new Metrolink stop, in close proximity to the old station site.

Location
Burton Road tram stop is located in the area between Withington and West Didsbury next to Burton Road. It is the closest stop to Withington Community Hospital.

Gallery

References

External links

 Metrolink Future Network - 2009 map of the extension plans (GMPTE)
 Metrolink stop information
 Burton Road area map

Railway stations in Great Britain opened in 2013
Tram stops in Manchester
Tram stops on the East Didsbury to Rochdale line
Withington